The Feast of the Assumption Festival (also locally referred to informally as The Feast (La festa)) is an annual four-day Catholic and Italian American street festival in the Little Italy neighborhood of Cleveland, Ohio, centered on Holy Rosary Church on Mayfield Road near its intersection with Murray Hill Road.

History and traditions
Held annually since 1898 (with exceptions in 1917–18, 1942–45 and 2020), the Feast occurs around August 15 in concordance with the observance of the Assumption of Mary. It includes a procession of a statue of the Virgin through the streets leading to the church, as well as a nightly mass. In addition to its religious nature, the Feast is also a general celebration of Cleveland's Italian cultural heritage in its largest Italian neighborhood, which has demographically remained relatively unchanged since its establishment in the 19th century.

Highlights of the festival include live musical performances, carnival and casino games, carnival rides and fireworks. The Feast is also famous for its food, with numerous street booths operated by local restaurants and shops from around the neighborhood selling traditional Italian food and other items to the large crowds that come to the neighborhood from all over the Greater Cleveland area.

References

External links

 Little Italy, Cleveland
 Holy Rosary Church

Italian-American culture in Cleveland
Festivals in Cleveland
Christianity in Cleveland
Festivals established in 1898
1898 establishments in Ohio